This is a list of chiptune artists. Bands are listed alphabetically by the first letter in their name, and individuals are listed by first name.

A
 Anamanaguchi
 Aivi & Surasshu

C
 Chipzel
 Crying

D
 Dunderpatrullen
 Decaying Tigers

F
 Toby Fox

G
 Goto80

H
 Horse the Band

I
 I Fight Dragons

K
 Karate High School

M
 Math the Band

S
 she
 Starship Amazing

W
 Watch Out For Snakes

See also
 List of Nintendocore bands

References 

Lists of musicians